Spinola is a surname. Notable people with the surname include:

 Agostino Spinola (d. 1537), Italian cardinal
 Alberto Spinola (born 1943), Italian water polo player
 Ambrogio Spinola, 1st Marquis of the Balbases (1569–1630), Genoese banker and nobleman who served as a Spanish general
 António Sebastião Spínola (1875–1956), Portuguese politician
 António de Spínola (1910–1996), Portuguese soldier and politician
 Agustín de Spínola Basadone (1597–1649), Spanish cardinal and Archbishop of Seville
 Battista Spinola, 16th-century Doge of Genoa
 Benedict Spinola (1519/20–1580), a 16th-century Genoese merchant in London
 Charles Spinola (died 1622), Beatified Spanish Jesuit missionary martyr in Japan
 Cristina Spínola (born 1976), Spanish journalist
 Cristoval Rojas de Spinola (died 1695), Spanish ecclesiastic
 Felipe Antonio Spinola, 4th Marquis of the Balbases (1665 – after 1721), Spanish courtier and Viceroy of Sicily
 Filippo Spinola (1535–1593), Italian cardinal
 Filippo Spinola, 2nd Marquis of Los Balbases (1594–1659)
 Francis Barretto Spinola (1821–1891), American soldier and congressman
 Giambattista Spinola (1615–1704), Cardinal and Archbishop of Genoa
 Giambattista Spinola, Jr (1646–1719), Italian cardinal
 Giandomenico Spinola (1580–1646), Italian cardinal
 Giovanni Battista Spinola (1681–1752), Italian cardinal
 Magdalena Spínola (1896-1991), Guatemalan poet
 Marcelo Spinola y Maestre (1835–1906), Archbishop of Seville
 Maximilian Spinola (1780–1857), Italian entomologist
 Oberto Spinola, 13th-century politician in Genoa
 Opicino Spinola, early fourteenth century, political leader in Genoa
 Paolo Spinola, 3rd Marquis of the Balbases (1628–1699), Spanish diplomat
 Ugo Pietro Spinola (1791–1858), Italian papal diplomat and cardinal

See also
Spinola family is a leading political family in Genoa from the 13th century onwards
Palazzo Spinola (disambiguation), a number of palaces in Italy and Malta
Spinola Bay, a bay in St. Julian's, Malta
Spinola Battery, a former battery in St. Julian's, Malta
Spinola Redoubt, a former redoubt in Birżebbuġa, Malta